Season of Fear is a 1989 American thriller film written and directed by Doug Campbell. The film stars Michael Bowen, Ray Wise, Clare Wren, Michael J. Pollard and Clancy Brown. The film was released on May 12, 1989, by United Artists.

Plot 
Fred Drummond (Ray Wise) longs to reconnect with his adult son, Mick (Michael Bowen). Fred hasn't been part of Mick's life for two decades. In the meantime, he has married Sarah (Clara Wren), a gorgeous woman many years his junior. The reunion seems to go well—until Mick and Sarah begin a tumultuous affair. If the bizarre love triangle between father, son and stepmother weren't dangerous enough, it soon gives life to a conspiracy that's even more complicated and deadly

Cast 
Michael Bowen as Mick Drummond
Ray Wise as Fred Drummond
Clare Wren as Sarah Drummond
Michael J. Pollard as Bob
Clancy Brown as Ward St. Clair
Heather Jane MacDonald as Penny
Dean Fortunato as David
Gregory R. Wolf as Bartender 
Susan Cherones as Cindy
Janice Doskey as Ranch Woman
Gannon McClaskey Wise as Young Mick
Heino G. Moeller as Bar Patron
Chrissy McCarthy as Bar Patron
Henry Harris as Hank
Rocky Capella as Precision Driver

References

External links 
 

1989 films
United Artists films
American thriller films
1989 thriller films
1980s English-language films
1980s American films